Tadeusz Kuchar (13 April 1891, in Kraków – 5 April 1966, in Warsaw) was a Polish athlete, footballer, swimmer, ice-skater, skier, sports official, and the brother of Wacław Kuchar.

For most of his life he was strongly connected with the team of Pogoń Lwów, where he played midfield. He was co-founder of the Polish Olympic Committee. Occasionally, in the years 1923, 1925 and 1928 he held the post of coach of the Polish National Team. Also, he was the first director of the Polish Track and Field Association and in 1945-1946 was the director of the Polish Football Association.

He fought in the World War One in Austro-Hungarian artillery. He fought in the Polish-Ukrainian War and the Polish-Soviet War as an artillery officer. He retired from the military in the rank of major. He kept his rank in spite of Poland becoming communist.

1891 births
1966 deaths
Polish male swimmers
Polish football managers
Polish footballers
Pogoń Lwów players
Sportspeople from Kraków
Lviv Polytechnic alumni
Burials at Powązki Military Cemetery
Recipients of the Order of Polonia Restituta
Recipients of the Silver Cross of the Virtuti Militari
Polish people of the Polish–Ukrainian War
Polish people of the Polish–Soviet War
Polish Austro-Hungarians
Association footballers not categorized by position